The Jaekel House is a 2-storey colonial mansion in Ebute Metta, Lagos, Nigeria. The house was built in 1898 on a large expanse of landscaped land and named after the late Francis Jaekel OBE, a former superintendent of the Nigerian Railway Corporation who retired in the 1970s after almost three decades of active service. Jaekel House was formally the residence of the General Manager and was later converted to a senior staff rest house. The building has been renovated and restored by Professor John Godwin in collaboration with the Railway Corporation in 2010. The building is now a “mini Museum”  showcasing photographic archives dating from 1940s through to 1970s of personalities, places, historical events in pre- and post-independent Nigeria and houses artefacts (tools, equipment, attires, pictures etc.) of the old Railway Corporation. It's also one of the fairy tale wedding locations in Lagos.

Jaekel House and Museum is now managed and maintained by Legacy1995 to preserve the legacy of the earliest railway tracks, repair yards and sheds in Nigeria.

Some scenes of Kunle Afolayan's Independence-era movie, October 1, 2019 biopic, The Herbert Macaulay Affair and a Simi music video were shot at Jaekel House.

References

External links

Houses in Lagos
Museums in Lagos
19th-century establishments in Lagos
Houses completed in 1898
1898 establishments in Lagos Colony
British colonial architecture in Nigeria
Historic buildings and structures in Nigeria
Historic house museums in Nigeria
19th-century architecture in Nigeria